Covivio, formerly Foncière des Régions, is a European investment and development company with business activities encompassing office real estate (46%), hotels (26%) and residential accommodation (26%). Europe's fourth-largest real estate investment trust (REIT), its portfolio is worth an estimated €23 billion. Two thirds of the portfolio is divided between Paris, Berlin and Milan, with an occupancy rate of 98.1%.

Covivio's strategy is to develop partnerships with cities and corporations. The group has a European development pipeline of €6 billion (€1.6 billion of committed pipeline at end 2018) to support its growth plans.

History
Foncière des Régions is a holding company of real estate investment (REIT) companies that own residential and commercial properties in 8 countries (mostly in Europe).  Its business comes from the rental and leasing of properties (including hotels and car lots), over 70% of which is office space in France and Italy (in 2009 vacancy rates were at 5.3% in France, in other major markets like Rome, Italy rental income was lower because office space use was halved).  Its biggest clients are major companies, the largest of which is France Telecom, which rented half of Fonciere's office space in France (about 1 million m2 (though its share of rental income was 51% in 2009 compared to 60% in 2008).  Other major customers are Telecom Italia and Electricite de France and IBM.  The company has a 15% interest in France's biggest business park developer, Altarea SCA.  Most properties are under its control; however, there are also about 60 properties that it has a minor stake in (interests in them range from 25 to 38 percent).  Widely recognized properties include one of France's tallest skyscrapers Tour Gan (also known as CB21) and Carré Suffren in Paris.

Other assets include parking lots (Parcs GFR), retirement homes, warehouses (Fonciere Europe Logistique SCA, Fonciere Developpement Logements SA) hotels, medical facilities, and business parks (15% of France's largest developer Altarea SA).

In August 2010 in a joint venture with France's largest bank Credit Agricole, it acquired 48 European hotels from hospitality company Accor.  The deal was worth 367 million euro.
After acquiring 35% of Italian real estate company Beni Stabili (public on the Milan stock exchange since 1999) from Italian company Delfin (Delfin and Batipart are Fonciere's largest shareholders) it purchased the rest of it in 2007.  It was Fonciere's single largest investment in Italy bringing its asset portfolio there to €4 billion.

Altogether the company had a market value of between €3.5 and €3.9 billion in 2010.

Fonciere des Regions was created in 1963 as Garages Souterrains de Metz an operator of underground garages/parking lots.
Most growth happened in the 21st century beginning with key acquisitions and leaseback agreements with EDF, AXA, AGF between 2000 and 2004.  In 2000 it acquired housing developer Sovakle.  In 2004 the division dealing with hotels, Foncière des Murs was formed.

Fonciere des Regions's largest shareholder is currently Italian Delfin (the holding company of Italian billionaire Leonardo Del Vecchio) with a nearly 30% stake.

In 2018, Foncière des Régions became Covivio.

Operations
Through subsidiaries Fonciere operates in France, Italy, UK, Luxembourg (Batisica, FDR Luxand and 67% ownership of CCP Duisberg and GSS III Partners), Germany (EM), Belgium (NC), USA (73% of Red Sail Real Estate Holding USA Inc. which is based in LA, NYC, and Chicago) and Portugal.

In 2010 rental income (€789.6 million consolidated up on the year due to French office acquisitions, of which €521.3 million represented the group share which was down slightly because of a lowered interest in Beni Stabili) came mostly from the offices business segment (totalled 79% 54% in France and 25% in Italy) but also from logistics operations (11%) and the service sector (10%).  Total revenues increased only in the service sector (4.4% due to 7% higher Accor income) and Italian offices sector (up 4.3%).  Vancancies affected results from the offices business in France.

Divisions (these three are separate publicly traded companies) in order of size are

Foncière Développement Logements controls all of the company's French (in Ile-de-France) and German (Bavaria, North Rhine-Westphalia, Lower Saxony) residential properties which include apartments and condominiums.  SCI Marceau and Triname and Garonor France III are among numerous subsidiaries managed through the division.

Foncière des Murs (25% interest) is a SIIC that provides hospitality services in addition to its function as landlord of hotels and restaurants.

Foncière Europe Logistique is the subsidiary that controls assets relating to Logistics in France and Germany.

Activities in Europe  
Covivio came into being in 2018 as the new name for Foncière des Régions, a French company set up in the early 2000s. The Covivio identity encompasses all the group's operations in Europe.
 Offices in France and Italy following the merger in December 2018 with its Italian subsidiary Beni Stabili 
 Residential accommodation in Germany via its subsidiary Covivio Immobilien (the new name for Immeo Wohnen), a real estate investment company specialised in the ownership and development of residential assets.
Hotels in Europe via its subsidiary Covivio Hotels (the new name for Foncière des Murs). Specialised in investing in hotel properties, Covivio Hotels was established in 2004 and is now Europe's leading hotel property investor. Lastly, in 2018, Covivio founded Welli, a dedicated flexible offices and co-working offering.

Positioning 
Covivio invests in, develops and manages office buildings, hotels and housing in Europe and also creates services specifically for these spaces, tailored to its customers. These include concierge services, co-living and co-working.

In 2018 Covivio announced developing a mixed-use urban complex of offices, co-working spaces, housing, services and shops on  Berlin's Alexanderplatz. Construction work  has not yet begun.

All of Covivio's new developments are certified (HQE, LEED, BREEAM, etc.) and the whole portfolio has embarked on a process of ecodesign. In the area of CSR, Covivio, which has 922 staff in Europe, has also taken steps to promote gender equality within the group through the Ex-aequo programme, and to support young students from disadvantaged backgrounds in their schooling and their career, in partnership with the young people's charity Article 1.

Covivio features in the EPRA and GPR 250 benchmark indices of European property companies and has received the EPRA BPR Gold Award for its financial and sustainable development reporting, a Carbon Disclosure Project rating of A and a Green Star in the GRESB (Global Real Estate Sustainability Benchmark) rankings. It also appears in the FTSE4 Good, DJSI World and Europe, Euronext Vigeo (World 120, Eurozone 120, Europe 120 and France 20), Euronext® CDP Environment France EW, Oekom, Ethibel and Gaïa ethical and ESG indices.

Activities and areas of expertise

Office property and co-working with Wellio 

Covivio has an office portfolio worth €10.6 billion in France and Italy, amounting to a floor area of 3.6 million m211. These assets achieve an occupancy rate of more than 97%.

In France, Covivio designs projects for new and refurbished offices in the Greater Paris region and in major regional cities such as Lyon, Bordeaux, Marseille, Toulouse and Montpellier. 
Covivio's investments in Italy are focused on the office market in Milan, which accounts for more than 70% of its Italian portfolio. In Milan, Covivio is developing the Symbiosis project, designed jointly with the city authority, which may eventually house 125,000 m2 of offices and services.
In 2019, Covivio will deliver six office buildings in France and Italy and will continue work on several other projects.

Covivio is developing co-working spaces with its Wellio subsidiary, established in 2018. Four sites were open at the start of 2019 (three in Paris and one in Marseille), comprising a total floor area of more than 12,000 m2. Another Wellio site will open its doors in Bordeaux in 2019, along with a further space on Milan's Via Dante.

Hotel infrastructure with Covivio Hotels 
 
The hotel business makes up 26% of Covivio's portfolio. It has some 45,000 rooms in France, Germany, the United Kingdom, Spain, Belgium and the Netherlands.

In 2018, Covivio paid €895 million to acquire 12 high-end hotels in major cities in the United Kingdom, including London, Glasgow, Edinburgh and Manchester.

As another example, Covivio is providing support to the Meininger hotel brand in its European development, with projects in Paris, Lyon, Munich and Milan. The group is also a partner of the Motel One brand, which opened its first hotel in France in Paris in 2018

Residential accommodation in Germany 

Covivio has a residential portfolio of €5.8 billion in Germany via Covivio Immobilien. This equates to more than 41,600 housing units, mainly in Berlin. The group has set up a development activity and is planning new projects worth €700 million.

In the German residential sector, Covivio provides furnished apartments, serviced housing and co-living accommodation  in Berlin. A further 3,000 rooms will be added by 2022 in vibrant districts of the city.

Sites in Europe 
Covivio is a European group based predominantly in France, Germany, Italy, the United Kingdom and Spain.
At the end of 2018, the group had invested €1.9 billion in the major European cities. The group employs 922 staff in Europe.

Management 
Christophe Kullmann, chief executive officer of Covivio
Olivier Estève, Deputy CEO 
Dominique Ozanne, Deputy CEO 
Jean Laurent, chairman of the Board of Directors

See also 

 Real estate companies in Germany

References

External links 
 Covivio website
 Wellio website
 Covivio.immo

Real estate investment trusts
Companies listed on Euronext Paris